KVAK (1230 AM) is a radio station licensed to serve Valdez, Alaska.  The station is owned by North Wave Communications, Inc. It airs a country music and talk radio format.

The station has been assigned these call letters by the Federal Communications Commission since August 9, 1982.

History of call letters 
The call letters KVAK previously were used by an AM station in Atchison, Kansas. That station began broadcasting on July 28, 1939, on 1420 kHz with 100 W power (daytime only).

References

External links
KVAK official website

VAK
Country radio stations in the United States
Talk radio stations in the United States
Radio stations established in 1981